Grandidierite is a rare mineral that was first discovered in 1902 in southern Madagascar. The mineral was named in honor of French explorer Alfred Grandidier (1836–1912) who studied the natural history of Madagascar.

Grandidierites appear bluer in color the more iron (Fe) they contain. A recently discovered gemstone, blue ominelite, is the Fe-analogue (Fe, Mg) to grandidierite (Mg, Fe).

Grandidierites display strong trichroic pleochroism. That means that it can show three different colors depending on the viewing angle: dark blue-green, colorless (sometimes a very light yellow), or dark green.

While trichroism can usually help distinguish grandidierites from other gems, lazulites can occur with blue-green colors and show colorless/blue/dark blue pleochroism. Nevertheless, lazulites have somewhat higher refractive indices and specific gravity. Grandidierites also have greater hardness, with a 7.5 on the Mohs scale.

Large transparent faceted grandidierite specimens are extremely rare. The largest cut specimen currently known to the GIA weighs in at 763.5 carats.

See also
List of minerals

References 

Orthorhombic minerals
Minerals in space group 62
Nesosilicates
Gemstones